Linda Finch (born March 13, 1951) is an American businesswoman, aviator, and aviation historian from San Antonio, Texas. Finch had 30 years of experience in the construction industry, making prefabricated buildings and operating healthcare facilities. She began her career managing nursing homes in her twenties, and owned several nursing homes in her thirties. Finch became interested in flying in her twenties, and purchased an airplane which she used in her nursing-home business. In her forties, during the 1990s, she added construction firms to her portfolio.

Finch's primary aircraft interest was World War II-era planes. She has restored vintage aircraft, and has participated in air shows and airplane races throughout the United States. Finch flew over 8,000 hours, about three-quarters of which were in single-engine planes, vintage multi-engine aircraft, and warplanes in air shows around the world for about 20 years. Joining the then named Confederate Air Force (now Commemorative Air Force), she learned to fly World War II-era Republic P-47 Thunderbolt fighter aircraft.

Finch is best known for her 1997 World Flight, which recreated (and completed) Amelia Earhart's world-record attempt. She flew a restored 1935 Lockheed Electra 10E, the same type of plane which Earhart flew in 1937 on her around-the-world attempt. Finch's Electra was modified, with a Global Positioning System, increased fuel capacity, and modern communications equipment. She followed Earhart's route as closely as she could, and completed the 26,000-mile trip around the world in 73 days. With Pratt & Whitney (who funded the restoration and flight), Finch established the You Can Soar educational and motivational program, which enabled students in 200,000 classrooms to follow her flight. Its website had about 30 million hits during her flight.

Early life and education
Finch was born in San Antonio, Texas on March 13, 1951. Her mother was Mary Beth Duerler; her father, Leslie Duerler, worked for Southwestern Bell and AT&T. Finch lived with her brothers Michael and Jerry in Highland Hills, a middle-class neighborhood in southern San Antonio. In her early teens, the family moved to a more prosperous suburb of the city. Finch began dating a young man from the local Army base and, when he received orders to go to Vietnam, they eloped in Mexico before he shipped out. Sixteen years old, she dropped out of John Marshall High School. They had a daughter, Julie, in February 1969 (just before Finch's 18th birthday); a year later, the couple ended their marriage.

Business career 
Finch obtained her high-school equivalency diploma in the early 1970s, and enrolled in accounting courses at Southwest Texas State University. She worked as a bookkeeper in New Jersey, Texas, South Dakota, Montana, and Illinois. Some of Finch's jobs were at nursing facilities, and she enjoyed working with seniors. She liked management, and one of her duties was to recruit 15 new residents a month for a nursing home in Aberdeen, South Dakota. Finch networked with key townspeople to reach the goal.

She decided to enter the nursing-home field in 1978, financing her first facility the following year with a loan from her grandparents (who refinanced their home with a proviso that if Finch failed, her family would repay the mortgage but she would lose her inheritance). An uncle, a pharmacist for whom she had provided bookkeeping services, helped finance her second nursing home. Finch acquired five more nursing homes over the next two years, with a total of 750 residents.

In 1982, at age 31, she employed 600 workers and founded the Care Centers Management Corporation to build retirement communities. By 1997 Finch owned retirement property, four nursing homes (with a total of 500 residents), and a construction firm which manufactured prefabricated buildings. At that time, her businesses employed 500 people and earned $14 million annually.

Flying career 

As a teenager, Finch thought it would be fun to fly the gull-winged World War II Corsair fighter plane. A single working mother, she used money budgeted for lunches to pay for flying lessons; by 1972, at age 21, she flew solo in a Grumman trainer aircraft. As Finch began looking for nursing homes to purchase, she decided to fly to the locations. She obtained her pilot's license in 1979; about a year later, she purchased a Piper Arrow which she flew across Texas to manage her nursing homes. Finch also flew her Beechcraft airplane to conduct business. During the mid-1980s she acquired a North American T-6 Texan, a World War II trainer which she restored to participate in air shows and races (including the Reno Air Races).

Finch joined the Confederate Air Force (now the Commemorative Air Force) early in her flying career, where she landed the Republic P-47D Thunderbolt without power 100 times. At the time, it was unusual for an aviatrix to fly the P-47. She was a major fundraiser for the restoration and marketing of the rare aircraft, only a small number of which still fly. Finch had restored six vintage planes by 1997. She has flown over 8,000 hours, three-quarters of the time in vintage multi-engine aircraft, warbirds and taildraggers. Finch has flown in air shows worldwide for more than 20 years.

World Flight 1997

In 1991, Finch began planning to duplicate Amelia Earhart's doomed 1937 World Flight. Earhart was the first female (and the second person, after Charles Lindbergh) to fly completely over the Atlantic Ocean, and the first aviator to fly solo across the Pacific from Hawaii to California. Earhart attracted the world's attention when she began her 29,000-nautical-mile global flight attempt, which Finch aimed to duplicate (and finish). On July 2, 1937, Earhart took off from New Guinea for Howland Island and disappeared without a trace over the South Pacific Ocean. Finch's flight marked the 60th anniversary of Earhart's failed effort, and the centennial of her birth.

Preparations

Finch flew a 1935 Lockheed Electra 10E, restored to the specifications of Earhart's Electra 10E. She believed that the flight should be in the same type of plane as Earhart's for historical purposes. Finch searched for three years for parts for one of only two such planes in existence, neither of which was flight-worthy. She found it in a garage at a small airstrip near Chippewa Falls, Wisconsin, where it had been sitting for years. A number of parts were missing; the wings and engines had been removed and sold, and the plane was corroded. Finch spent $330,000 (most of her savings) to purchase it and haul it back to her Texas hometown.

Pratt & Whitney, manufacturer of the Wasp radial engines which powered Earhart's Electra, donated $1.5 million in March 1995 to help Finch restore the plane. It underwrote the $4 million flight, and the Hartford Courant was a sponsor. The Electra was methodically reassembled in accordance with its original specifications. Pictures of Earhart's plane and original drawings and photographs from Lockheed aided in the restoration. Although it was not completely restored until 1997, the plane was able to fly in July 1996.

Earhart's radio gear was antiquated, but Finch's Electra was designed with state-of-the-art radio navigation and weather radar. She had a GPS receiver for world navigation and tracking her exact location. The Electra's fuel-tank capacity was increased from 800 pounds to 1,800 pounds for island-hopping across oceans. The National Geographic Society supplied a video camera for the plane, which had Internet access and a fax machine.

Despite modern equipment aiding navigation and communication, flying a heavy plane built for short distanceswas hazardous; Finch had to contend with heat and loud noise from the engines during flight. Another plane was outfitted with modern communication and navigational equipment to accompany her. Finch's team for the flight included Pratt & Whitney employees, two navigators, and a staff which promoted the flight.

Recreation of historic flight

Finch's recreated flight began at Oakland International Airport in Oakland, California on March 17, 1997, 60 years after Amelia Earhart's around-the-world flight attempt from the airport. Finch's flight plan, patterned on Earhart's route, included 34 stops in 19 countries. The flight took 73 days, ending on May 28 at the same airport. The trip took about 225 hours of flying time. The Electra's cabin was not pressurized; it did not carry oxygen and, like Earhart, Finch flew under  for most of the trip.

She touched down on five continents, mirroring Earhart's route and its stops. Finch visited 18 counties, with a total of 34 landings. She flew an additional 1,000 miles to drop a wreath over Howland Island from her aircraft to honor Earhart. (Amelia Earhart disappeared on her way to Howland Island on July 2, 1937.) Finch's last leg, the flight's longest, was on May 28: an estimated 18-hour flight covering  between Hawaii and Oakland, California. She was met by a large crowd, and had a reception and dinner at the Western Aerospace Museum in Oakland. Finch was 46 at the time of the flight, seven years older than Earhart was on her final flight.

You Can Soar
Finch hoped that children around the world would get an educational experience from her venture. She tied her flight to the educational series, You Can Soar. The flight and education programs were supported by Pratt & Whitney. Finch's team and Pratt & Whitney developed a free, multimedia curriculum which was sent to schools for fifth- through eighth-grade students. The curriculum included geography, time zones, weather gauging, and Earhart's legacy. Addressing the countries which Finch visited, the program's cultural-studies portion taught poetry, language, and art.

Finch met with schoolchildren throughout the United States and Europe. The computer equipment in her aircraft communicated her daily progress via the Internet to children in nearly 200,000 classrooms worldwide. The website was accessed about 30 million times in  months. Finch used a laptop in the cockpit of the Electra to relay details of her journey and answer schoolchildren's emails.

After the flight
After finishing the historic flight, Finch said to the spectators and media at Oakland International Airport:

She appeared at aviation-related events, schools, businesses, museums, and children's programs to encourage others to dream and make a big difference in the world. The Museum of Flight in Seattle acquired the Electra. Finch was honored by the Gathering of Eagles Program in 1999.

Personal life
Finch's three marriages ended in divorce. After her first marriage, she worked as a bookkeeper and manager before marrying for a second time. Finch returned to San Antonio and had her second child, a son named Leslie. Her third marriage, in 1983 to businessman Delos Finch, lasted for ten years. Finch has three children: Julie and Leslie (born in about 1969 and 1976), and a granddaughter (born about 1995) whom she adopted. She lived in San Antonio, where she owned a  farm and cattle ranch near Mason, Texas.

See also
 Ann Pellegreno, in 1967, completed a world flight by flying a plane similar to Earhart's plane.

Notes

References

Citations

Sources

 
 
 
 
 
 

1951 births
Living people
Aviators from Texas
Businesspeople from North Carolina
Businesspeople from San Antonio
American women aviators
Amelia Earhart